Henry Sharratt (1936 – June 8, 2018) was an English professional rugby league footballer who played in the 1950s and 1960s.

Background
Henry Sharratt's birth was registered in Wakefield district, West Riding of Yorkshire, England.

He worked at Newmarket Silkstone Colliery, Methley, Leeds. A broken leg in April 1958 curtailed his progress in the rugby league. He lived in Outwood, Wakefield and was the director of Eastmoor Dragons A.R.L.F.C. (in Eastmoor, Wakefield) from 25 August 1991 to 30 August 1999. He died after a long illness aged 82 in Wakefield, West Yorkshire, England.

Playing career

Club career
Henry Sharratt played for England (Juniors) against France (Juniors) at Central Park, Wigan on Saturday 9 April 1955, were he made his début for Wakefield Trinity. He played left-, i.e. number 11 (alongside right- Reg Parker). Sharratt's interchange of passes in this match also helped Neil Fox to score 6-tries. With 6-goals, Fox set Wakefield Trinity's then 'most points in a match' record with 30-points. Sharratt played his second match, and scored a try in the 61-12 victory over Batley at Belle Vue, Wakefield on Wednesday 2 April 1958. Unfortunately, he broke his leg in this match, and he was sidelined for 6-months, but following an injury to Albert Firth, he returned to the first team and played  (alongside  Don Vines) in the 29-8 victory over Dewsbury at Belle Vue, Wakefield. 

During early October 1958, he played as a forward, regularly scoring tries in Wakefield Trinity's A-Team during the 1958–59 season. He played his last first-team match for Wakefield Trinity during the 1958–59 season. Despite protestations by Wakefield Trinity's coach; Ken Traill, he was transferred from Wakefield Trinity to Featherstone Rovers, he made his début for Featherstone Rovers on Monday 17 August 1959. He played regularly in Featherstone Rovers' A-Team, and he played his last match for Featherstone Rovers during the 1960–61 season. He was transferred from Featherstone Rovers to Bradford Northern. He was transferred from Bradford Northern to Dewsbury, and then,was transferred from Dewsbury to Batley. He made his début for Batley in the 9-6 victory over Doncaster at Mount Pleasant, Batley on Tuesday 24 August 1965. He scored his only try for Batley in the defeat by Keighley at Mount Pleasant, Batley on Saturday 25 September 1965.

References

External links
Search for "Sharratt" at rugbyleagueproject.org

1936 births
2018 deaths
Batley Bulldogs players
Bradford Bulls players
Dewsbury Rams players
English rugby league players
Featherstone Rovers players
Place of death missing
Rugby league centres
Rugby league props
Rugby league second-rows
Rugby league wingers
Rugby league players from Wakefield
Wakefield Trinity players